Ballipadar is a village under Buguda block of Ganjam district located in Odisha, India. It is also a "Grama Panchayat", consisting of 3 villages: Balipadar, Sadasiba Pur Sasan and Sana Balipadar. According to the 2011 census it has a population of 5417 living in 1166 households.

It should not be confused with Balipadar in the Badagada subdistrict or Balipadar in the Brahmapur Sadar subdistrict.

Jogigumpha is famous from the Bhanj dynasty workshop of Silpi Jogi Maharana, which is situated at the south-west of Balipdar. Jogi Maharana belongs to Soma Vansa Bhardwaj Gotra. He made a wooden doll named Kalabati that looked like a beautiful living girl.

References

External links

Villages in Ganjam district